The International Literary Prize of the city of Sassari takes place during the festival Ottobre in Poesia.

This event is held annually in the city of Sassari in the month of October.

Knowing the Festival 

The Festival Ottobre in Poesia get under way with its first edition in 2007, year when was announced and made known the announcement of The International Literary Prize of the city of Sassari, which awards were held during the second edition of the Festival.
The prize take this name only from 2010; before it existed with the denomination Island of Verses.

During the days of the Festival, come one after the other meetings with authors, readings, performances, concerts and art installations; all events that, in last editions of the Festival, spread and widened, also involving nearby cities.

All the emotions and the artistic contributions of each edition of the prize, are collected in an anthology printed in limited edition.
The festival was a great success of people since the early years and is currently among the most important literary and cultural events of the poetic landscape, also thanks to the importance of the guests who are invited to Sassari.

The 2012 edition start from Carbonia: "Waiting Ottobre in Poesia" with an exhibition of works at international level directed by Shikanu ', a recital and theatrical performance in schools; of a "After Festival" with a recital-shows at the Vecchio Mulino of Sassari, and meetings with schools of Alghero.

In 2013 there will be the sixth edition of the International Literary Prize City of Sassari and the seventh edition of the festival Ottobre in Poesia.

Organizers and planners 
The credit for the success of this initiative is due to:

author and artistic director: Leonardo Omar Onida;
editing anthology literary prize: Erika Pirodda e Valeria Alzari;
secretary's office literary prize: Erika Pirodda;
graphics: Stefania Onida;
public relations: Bianca Maria Demontis;
press office and communication: Valentina Cei and Stefania Battistella;
coordination and welcoming: Valeria Alzari;
technical supervision: Giuseppe Sanna;
web and information technology: Fabrizio Spiga.

Knowing the Prize 
The International Literary Prize of the city of Sassari is a very comprehensive literature contest, which provides for specific areas:

Poetry

Island of Verses 
includes two sections:
published;
unpublished - Beppe Costa Prize - (only competition that dedicates his award to a living poet);
Jury Schools Special Prize – (in which students from three high schools are active);

Fiction

Fabula Mundi 
includes one section:
unpublished: short stories in free subject.

Publication
 L'Isola dei Versi, anthology 2008, ;
 Premio Letterario Internazionale Città di Sassari, anthology 2011, .

UNESCO and Presidency of Italian Republic for Ottobre in Poesia 
The importance attained by the Festival in recent editions, has allowed the granting of major patronage:
from 2010 under the patronage of Presidency of Italian Republic, Ministry of Heritage and Culture, Minister of Youth;
from 2011 under the patronage of UNESCO - Italian National Commission for UNESCO -
In addition to previous patronage of the Autonomous Region of Sardinia, Town of Tissi and Sassari.

Places 
The places where the festival takes place are very different from each other and displaced in different cities:
Sassari: academy of music, Frumentaria, Vecchio Mulino, Patiu di lu Diaulu, Spano senior high school, Messaggerie Sarde bookshop, Nazario Sauro square, L.go Sisini, public gardens, Civic Theatre, Monserrato Park, University of Sassari;
Alghero: Casa Parco Porto Conte;
Tissi: public library;
Nuoro: senior high school specializing in classical studies;
Bosa: Casa del Popolo;
Modolo: Parish Hall;
Carbonia: Public Library.

Guests of the Festival 
Particular attention is given to the meeting of the last day of the Festival at the Civic Theatre in Sassari where all guests and participants gather together in order to follow the performances (recitals, plays, etc.) of the most important guests of the Festival.
In fact The Festival, over all its five editions, has been able to count on the participation of prominent figures as: :it:Silvano Agosti, Beppe Costa, Giovanna Mulas, Gabriel Impaglione, Fernando Arrabal, Jack Hirschman, Paul Polansky, Robert Minhinnick, Alex Pausides, Tino Petilli, Hernan Loyola, Jan Fortune, Desmond Egan, Andrea Garbin, Fabio Barcellandi, Stefania Battistella, :it:Adele Cambria, Alessandra Celletti, Dave Lordan, Antonella Meloni Corsini. In 2013, as special guest the poet and ex Israeli ambassador to Norway Naim Araidi

References

External links 
 official web site Ottobre in Poesia

Poetry organizations
Italian literary awards
Awards established in 2007